Khalilabad was a Lok Sabha (parliamentary) constituency in Uttar Pradesh state in northern India until 2008.

Assembly segments
Khalilabad comprised the following five assembly segments:
 Alapur
Khajni
Menhdawal
Khalilabad
 Dhanghata

Members of Parliament

1957: Kapil Dev Rai, Indian National Congress
1962 Sri Ram Rai, Bharatiya Jana Sangh

1967: Major Ranjeet Singh, Bharatiya Jana Sangh

1971: Krishna Chandra Pandey, Indian National Congress,
1977: Brij Bhushan Tiwari, Bharatiya Lok Dal
1980: Krishna Chandra Pandey, Indian National Congress (Indira)
1984: Chandra Shekhar Tripathi, Indian National Congress
1989: Ram Prasad Chaudhary, Janata Dal
1991: Ashthabhuja Prasad Shukla, Bharatiya Janata Party
1996: Surendra Yadav, Janata Dal
1998: Indrajeet Mishra, Bharatiya Janata Party
1999: Bhal Chandra Yadav, Samajwadi Party
2004: Bhal Chandra Yadav, Bahujan Samaj Party
2007: Bhisma Shankar Tiwari, Bahujan Samaj Party (By Poll)

After 2008 Delimition, this comes under Sant Kabir Nagar Lok Sabha constituency

See also
 Sant Kabir Nagar district
 List of former constituencies of the Lok Sabha

Former Lok Sabha constituencies of Uttar Pradesh
Former constituencies of the Lok Sabha